Ariel was a 4-masted schooner built by Matthew Turner in 1900. She was wrecked at Inuboyesaki, Japan, in 1917.

References

External links

Schooners of the United States
Individual sailing vessels
Ships built in Benicia, California
Shipwrecks of Japan
Maritime incidents in 1917
1900 ships